Carlos Tovar Venegas (2 April 1914 – 15 June 2006) was a Peruvian international football player. He participated with the Peru national football team at the 1936 Summer Olympics in Berlin.

Career
Tovar played club football for Universitario de Deportes. He earned 15 caps for Peru between 1935 and 1939.

References

External links

1914 births
2006 deaths
Footballers at the 1936 Summer Olympics
Olympic footballers of Peru
Peruvian footballers
Peruvian Primera División players
Club Universitario de Deportes footballers
Copa América-winning players
Association football forwards
Peru international footballers